The DRC or Democratic Republic of the Congo is a country in Central Africa.

DRC may also refer to:

Organisations
 Danish Refugee Council, a Danish humanitarian organisation
 Democratic Representative Caucus, a group of Canadian Members of Parliament
 Disability Rights Commission, a body set up by the British Parliament
 Dynamics Research Corporation, a US-based defense contractor

Science and technology
 Design rule checking, area of electronic design automation
 Digital room correction, a process in the field of acoustics
 Dynamic range compression, a process that manipulates an audio signal
 Dynamic range control, a feature of digital audio compression
 Dynamic recompilation, a technique of translating machine code
 DARPA Robotics Challenge
 Domain relational calculus, a database query language

Other uses
 DRC railcar, a railway vehicle in Victoria, Australia
 Democratic Resettlement Community, an informal settlement in Swakopmund, Namibia
 Domaine de la Romanée-Conti, a wine producer of Burgundy, France
 Dominique Rodgers-Cromartie, a former American football player 
 Dr. Regis Chaperon State Secondary School, a secondary school in Mauritius
 , a Brazilian rock-band
 Dirico Airport's IATA code
 DRC, the Challoner revision of the  Bible

See also
 Dutch Reformed Church (disambiguation)